Lapeer County is a county located in the U.S. state of Michigan. As of the 2020 Census, the population was 88,619. The county seat is Lapeer. The county was created on September 18, 1822, and was fully organized on February 2, 1835.  The name is a corruption of the French la pierre, which means "the stone". Lapeer County is located north of Detroit and east of Flint.

History

Lapeer County was part of New France from 1534. As New France gained in population, this area was considered part of the Pays d'en Haut (upper countries) dependency of the Colony of Canada, from its formation as a department of New France in 1712. In 1763 England took possession of all French territory in North America east of the Mississippi River after winning the Seven Years' War. It renamed the colony and its dependencies as the Province of Quebec. France and England had controlled trading with First Nations in this area by establishing forts as a place for gathering and trading, and to settle disputes and enforce laws. They used the ancient overland and waterborne trade routes of the First Nations, while providing superior tools and weapons in exchange for valuable furs.

Following the American Revolution, Great Britain ceded portions of the Province of Quebec to the newly independent United States of America. By an ordinance of the Congress of the United States passed on July 13, 1787, under the Articles of Confederation, the whole of the territory of the United States lying northwest of the Ohio River and east of the Mississippi River, though still occupied by the British, was organized as the Northwest Territory. The area that is now Lapeer County used to be a part of the County of Wayne, named in the honor of General Anthony Wayne. This original Wayne County was created on August 11, 1796; very large, it included all of the lower peninsula of Michigan, parts of Northern Ohio and Indiana, and also portions of Wisconsin and Illinois. As population increased in the area, new counties were organized in this territory.

What is now Lapeer County, on May 7, 1800, was considered part of the Territory of Indiana, which included all of the lower peninsula of Michigan. After Ohio and Indiana became states, the Territory of Michigan was formed. In 1807 local Indian tribes: the Ottawa, Ojibwa (Chippewa), Wyandot and Potawatomi, ceded the land of Southeast Michigan to the United States in the Treaty of Detroit. They had been under pressure for some time, especially as they had been allied with the British in the Revolutionary War. They were encouraged to move west out of the area, but some remained in Michigan.

In January 1820, the County of Oakland was formed. On September 18, 1822, Governor Lewis Cass set Lapeer County's boundaries, although it remained a part of Oakland County until it was organized. Lapeer County officially became a county on February 2, 1835. The first recorded elections for county officers, with 520 people voting, occurred in 1837.

The first European-American settler in Lapeer was Alvin N. Hart, who was born in Cornwall, Connecticut on February 11, 1804. He came to Lapeer in 1831 and platted the Village of Lapeer on November 8, 1833. The plat was registered in Pontiac, December 14, 1833, in Oakland County's Associate Judge Bagley's court. Alvin Hart became a state senator in 1843, representing Lapeer, Oakland, Genesee, Shiawassee, Tuscola, Saginaw counties and the entire Upper Peninsula. He was instrumental in having the state capital moved from Detroit to Lansing.

On March 9, 1843, a column of townships was removed from westernmost Lapeer County and annexed to Genesee County. From north to south, the townships were Forest, Richfield, Davison and Atlas.

Lumber was the principal industry of the Lapeer County area from the 1830s until 1870. Lumber was in demand with development throughout the Midwest. In addition there was the expectation that clearing much of the county's forests would attract farmers as settlers. Lapeer's economy shifted to become primarily agriculturally based.

On October 26, 2010, Lapeer became a founding member of the Karegnondi Water Authority.

Historical markers
Fifteen historical markers have been installed throughout Lapeer County commemorating sites and structures of interest:
 Columbiaville Depot
 Currier House (Almont)
 Dryden Depot
 General Squier Memorial Park (Dryden Township)
 Grand Trunk Western Railroad Depot / Imlay City
 Grettenberger Field (Imlay City)
 Henry Stephens Memorial Library (Almont)
 Ladies Library Hall (Dryden)
 Lapeer County (at Lapeer County Courthouse)
 Lapeer Public Library
 Pioneer Bank (North Branch)
 St. Patrick's Church (Clifford)
 Tuttle House (Lapeer)
 United Methodist Church (Columbiaville)
 William Peter Mansion (Columbiaville)

Geography
Lapeer County's geography is very similar to Oakland County, except Lapeer County is more rural. Lapeer is one of the five counties that form the peninsula projecting into Lake Huron known as The Thumb, which in turn is a sub-region of Mid Michigan.

The headwaters of the Flint River are in Columbiaville. It flows through the county toward Genesee. The City of Lapeer straddles it course.

Major highways
 runs east and west through the county
 runs north and south through the western part of the county, including the city of Lapeer
 runs north and south through the eastern part of the county, including Imlay City
 runs east and west through the county, including the city of North Branch

Adjacent counties

Sanilac County  (northeast)
Tuscola County  (northwest)
St. Clair County  (east)
Genesee County  (west)
Macomb County  (southeast)
Oakland County  (southwest)

Demographics

As of the 2010 United States Census, there were 88,319 people living in the county. 95.5% were White, 1.0% Black or African American, 0.5% Native American, 0.3% Asian, 1.2% of some other race and 1.4% of two or more races. 4.1% were Hispanic or Latino (of any race). 23.9% were of German, 10.9% English, 10.4% Irish, 8.6% Polish, 7.3% American and 5.2% French, French Canadian or Cajun ancestry.

As of the census of 2000, there were 87,904 people, 30,729 households, and 23,876 families living in the county. There were 32,732 housing units at an average density of 50 per square mile (19/km2). The racial makeup of the county was 96.17% White, 0.82% Black or African American, 0.38% Native American, 0.39% Asian, 0.01% Pacific Islander, 1.07% from other races, and 1.16% from two or more races.  3.11% of the population were Hispanic or Latino of any race. 24.2% were of German, 11.8% English, 9.7% American, 9.6% Irish and 9.4% Polish ancestry, 95.9% spoke English and 2.6% Spanish as their first language.

In 2000, there were 30,729 households, of which 38.30% had children under the age of 18 living with them, 65.70% were married couples living together, 8.10% had a female householder with no husband present, and 22.30% were non-families. 18.50% of all households were made up of individuals, and 6.90% had someone living alone who was 65 years of age or older.  The average household size was 2.80 and the average family size was 3.19.

The county's population was spread out in terms of age, with 28.00% under the age of 18, 7.70% from 18 to 24, 31.00% from 25 to 44, 23.80% from 45 to 64, and 9.60% who were 65 years of age or older.  The median age was 36 years. For every 100 females, there were 102.40 males.  For every 100 females age 18 and over, there were 101.10 males.

The median income for a household in the county was $51,717, and the median income for a family was $57,817. Males had a median income of $47,506 versus $26,385 for females. The per capita income for the county was $21,462.  About 3.80% of families and 5.40% of the population lived below the poverty line, including 5.70% of those under age 18 and 7.50% of those age 65 or over.

Government

The county government operates the jail, maintains rural roads, operates the major local courts, keeps files of deeds and mortgages, maintains vital records, administers public health regulations, runs county parks, and participates with the state in the provision of welfare and other social services. The county board of commissioners controls the budget but has only limited authority to make laws or ordinances.  In Michigan, most local government functions — police and fire, building and zoning, tax assessment, street maintenance, etc. — are the responsibility of individual cities, villages, and townships.

Elected officials (2022)
 Prosecuting Attorney: John Miller  
 Sheriff: Scott McKenna
 County Clerk: Theresa M. Spencer
 County Treasurer: Dana M. Miller
 Register of Deeds: Lori Gebhardt
 Drain Commissioner: Joseph E. Suma 
 County Surveyor: Richard A. Duthler, P.S.

Board of Commissioners
7 members, elected from districts (1 Democrat, 6 Republicans)

Communities

Cities
Brown City (partly in Sanilac County)
Imlay City
Lapeer (county seat)

Villages
Almont
Clifford
Columbiaville
Dryden
Metamora
North Branch
Otter Lake

Census-designated places
Attica
Barnes Lake
Millers Lake

Other unincorporated communities

Burnside
Elba
Farmers Creek
Five Lakes
Goodland
Hadley
Hunters Creek
Kerr Hill
Kings Mill
Lum
Silverwood
Thornville

Townships

Almont Township
Arcadia Township
Attica Township
Burlington Township
Burnside Township
Deerfield Township
Dryden Township
Elba Township
Goodland Township
Hadley Township
Imlay Township
Lapeer Township
Marathon Township
Mayfield Township
Metamora Township
North Branch Township
Oregon Township
Rich Township

See also

 List of Michigan State Historic Sites in Lapeer County, Michigan
National Register of Historic Places listings in Lapeer County, Michigan

References

External links
Official Lapeer County Website

 
Metro Detroit
Michigan counties
1835 establishments in Michigan Territory
Populated places established in 1835